You Remember Ellen is a 1912 American silent film produced by Kalem Company and distributed by General Films. It was directed by Sidney Olcott with Gene Gauntier and Jack J. Clark in the leading roles. It was one of more than a dozen films produced by the Kalem Company filmed in Ireland for American audiences.

Plot
The film is based on the poem You Remember Ellen by Thomas Moore, of which selected verses appear as intertitles in the film. Ellen is a young countrywoman who marries a traveling peasant named William. The couple leaves Ellen's home to seek their fortune elsewhere. Eventually they come upon a mansion, where William reveals that he is an aristocrat in disguise and they are Lord and Lady of Rosna Hall.

Cast
 Gene Gauntier as Ellen
 Jack J. Clark as William
 Anna Clark as Ellen's Mother
 Alice Hollister as Jane
 Arthur Donaldson 
 Robert Vignola 
 J.P. McGowan

Production notes
The film was shot in Beaufort, County Kerry, Ireland, during summer of 1911.

References

Further reading
 Michel Derrien, Aux origines du cinéma irlandais: Sidney Olcott, le premier oeil, TIR 2013.  
 Denis Condon, Touristic Work and Pleasure: The Kalem Company in Killarney

External links

 You Remember Ellen website dedicated to Sidney Olcott
Full restored film by Trinity College, Dublin on YouTube

1912 films
American silent short films
Films set in Ireland
Films shot in Ireland
Films directed by Sidney Olcott
Kalem Company films
1912 romantic drama films
American romantic drama films
American black-and-white films
Films based on poems
1910s American films
Silent romantic drama films
Silent American drama films